Eucalyptus is a diverse genus of flowering trees in the myrtle family.

Eucalyptus may also refer to:
 Eucalyptus (Avey Tare album) (2017)
 Eucalyptus (Pitchfork album) (1990)
 Eucalyptus (novel), a novel by Murray Bail
 Eucalyptus (film), projected adaptation of the novel
 Eucalyptus (software), computer software for cloud computing

See also
Calypso (disambiguation)
Eucalypt
Encalypta